Jan Wils (22 February 1891 – 11 February 1972) was a Dutch architect. He was born in Alkmaar and died in Voorburg.

Wils was one of the founding members of the De Stijl movement, which also included artists as Piet Mondrian, Theo van Doesburg and Gerrit Rietveld.

Among other works, Wils designed the Olympic Stadium for the 1928 Summer Olympics in Amsterdam. His design was also entered in the Olympic art competition, and won the gold medal. he also designed the Papaverhof housing complex, now a Rijksmonument (Dutch national heritage site).

References

External links

 Short biography

1891 births
1972 deaths
Dutch architects
People from Alkmaar
Olympic gold medalists in art competitions
Medalists at the 1928 Summer Olympics
Olympic competitors in art competitions